Friedrich Ludwig Zacharias Werner (November 18, 1768 – January 17, 1823) was a German poet, dramatist, and preacher. As a dramatist, he is known mainly for inaugurating the era of the so-called "tragedies of fate".

Biography
Werner was born at Königsberg in East Prussia. At the University of Königsberg, he studied law and attended Kant's lectures. Jean-Jacques Rousseau and Rousseau's German disciples were also influences that shaped his view of life. He lived an irregular life and entered a series of unsuccessful marriages. However his talent was soon recognized, and in 1793 he became chamber secretary in the Prussian service in Warsaw. In 1805 he obtained a government post in Berlin, but two years later he retired from the public service in order to travel.

In the course of his travels, and by correspondence, Werner became acquainted with many eminent literary figures of the time, for example Goethe at Weimar and Madame de Staël at Coppet. At Rome, he joined the Roman Catholic Church in 1811. He was consecrated a priest in 1814 at Aschaffenburg, and, exchanging the pen for the pulpit, became a popular preacher in Vienna, where, during a congress in 1814, his eloquent sermons were listened to by crowded congregations. He was later appointed head of the chapter of the cathedral of Kaminiec.

Werner died in Vienna.

Works
He succeeded in having his plays put on the stage, where they met with much success. Verdi's opera Attila is based on Werner's drama of the same name. Werner's Der 24. Februar, thus titled because his mother and an intimate friend died on that day, introduced the era of the so-called "tragedies of fate." Several of his dramatic poems were designed to evangelize freemasonry. Among his titles were:

Vermischte Gedichte, 1789
Die Söhne des Thals, 1803-1804, in two parts
Die Templer auf Cypern, 1803
 The Templars in Cyprus English
Die Kreuzesbrüder, 1804
The Brethren of the Cross: a dramatic poem English
Das Kreuz an der Ostsee, 1806
Die Brautnacht, 1806
Martin Luther oder die Weihe der Kraft, 1806
Der vierundzwanzigste Februar, 1808 (translated into French by Jules Lacroix, Paris, 1849)
Attila, König der Hunnen, romantische Tragödie, 1809
Wanda, 1810
Die Weihe der Unkraft, 1813, a recantation of his earlier work Martin Luther
Kunigunde die Heilige, 1815
Geistliche Übungen für drei Tage, 1818
Die Mutter der Makkabäer, 1820

Zacharias Werner's Theater, a collection (without the author's consent) of Werner's work in 6 volumes, appeared in 1816-1818. Ausgewählte Schriften (Selected writings with a biography by K. J. Schütz) in 15 volumes appeared 1840-1841.

Notes

References

Attribution:

External links

1768 births
1823 deaths
University of Königsberg alumni
19th-century German poets
Converts to Roman Catholicism
Coppet group
German Roman Catholics
Writers from Königsberg
German male poets
19th-century German male writers
Clergy from Königsberg